Moron Lake is a lake in Aleutians West Census Area, Alaska, in the United States.

Moron Lake was so named because the U.S. military needed a name to begin with the letter M in order to fit with their alphabetical naming system.

References

Lakes of Alaska
Bodies of water of Aleutians West Census Area, Alaska